Eastern Sierra Regional Airport  is two miles east of Bishop, in Inyo County, California, United States. It is owned by the City of Los Angeles, Department of Public Works and operated by Inyo County.

Facilities

In the year ending October 23, 2006 the airport had 26,000 aircraft operations, average 71 per day: 88% general aviation and 12% military. 64 aircraft were then based at the airport: 81% single-engine, 13% multi-engine, 2% jet and 5% glider.

Airlines and destinations

Effective December 19, 2021, SkyWest Airlines operating as United Express via a code sharing agreement with United Airlines began nonstop service to the airport, utilizing Bombardier CRJ700 regional jet aircraft. Winter 22/23 will include daily flights to San Francisco (SFO) and Denver (DEN). These new flights replaced United Express service to nearby Mammoth Yosemite Airport and also marked the return of scheduled passenger service to Eastern Sierra Regional Airport and Bishop.

Historical military use
The airfield opened in April 1940 on  subleased from Inyo County. During World War II it was known as Bishop Army Airfield and was a sub-base to Muroc Army Airfield in 1942 and 1943 for Fourth Air Force. The site was used for aircraft flight and ordnance delivery training. In 1943 it was reassigned to Tonopah Army Airfield, Nevada. Aircraft maintenance and ordnance storage were also done.

After the end of World War II, Bishop AAF was turned over to Air Technical Service Command as a storage airfield.

The U.S. Air Force subleased runway use rights and a heliport area of  known as the Bishop Test Site from Inyo County from 15 November 1965 to 19 June 1971 and from 25 November 1980 to 30 September 1985. The Air Force used the heliport area and runway for performance testing of helicopters and other aircraft. The U.S. DoD facilities included runway expansion, fuel facilities, utilities, buildings, aircraft maintenance, hospital and barracks.

Today, the airport is owned by the City of Los Angeles, California and is leased to Inyo County.

Historical airline service
Trans Sierra Airlines, a commuter air carrier, was serving the airport in 1971 with two daily flights to Los Angeles (LAX) and two daily flights to San Jose (SJC) operated with Cessna 402 twin prop aircraft. Trans Sierra then changed its name to Sierra Pacific Airlines, which during the mid-1970s was operating direct service to Burbank (BUR) in the Los Angeles area and also to Las Vegas (LAS) via an intermediate stop at the nearby Mammoth Yosemite Airport as well as nonstop service to Fresno (FAT) with Handley Page Jetstream commuter propjets. In 1980 and 1981, Air Sierra was operating nonstop flights to Fresno with Piper Navajo twin prop aircraft. Also in 1981, Wings West Airlines was operating direct flights to Santa Monica (SMO) and Sacramento (SMF) via an intermediate stop at Mammoth Lakes Yosemite Airport as well as nonstop service to Oakland (OAK) with Cessna 402 twin prop aircraft. In 1983, Mojave Airlines was operating flights to Los Angeles (LAX), San Diego (SAN), Ontario (ONT), Inyokern (IYK) and Fox Field (WJF) in Lancaster with Beechcraft C99 commuter turboprops. By 1988, Alpha Air was providing commuter airline service with Beechcraft 1900C propjets direct to Los Angeles (LAX) and Oakland (OAK) as well as nonstop service to San Jose (SJC).

Accidents and incidents
On March 13, 1974 a David L. Wolper Productions crew filming a National Geographic history of Australopithecus at Mammoth Mountain Ski Area was killed when Sierra Pacific Airlines Flight 802, a Convair 440, crashed shortly after takeoff from the airport, killing all 36 on board including 31 Wolper crew members (but not Wolper himself). The filmed segment was recovered in the wreckage and was broadcast on the television show Primal Man. The U.S. National Transportation Safety Board never determined the cause of the accident, and the resort sold the airline.
On August 11, 2002, Galen Rowell, his wife Barbara Cushman Rowell, pilot Tom Reid, and Reid's friend Carol McAffee were killed when an Aero Commander 690 crashed on a night approach into Eastern Sierra Regional Airport.

See also

 California World War II Army Airfields
 National Landmark of Soaring

References

External links
 

Airports in Inyo County, California
Airfields of the United States Army Air Forces in California
Bishop, California
Gliding in the United States
Owens Valley